is a virologist specializing in the study of the influenza and Ebola viruses. He holds a professorship in virology in the Department of Pathobiological Sciences at the University of Wisconsin-Madison, USA, and at the University of Tokyo, Japan.

Following the West African Ebola virus epidemic of 2014, Kawaoka began development of an Ebola vaccine working in close coordination with Alhaji N'jai a toxicologist at the University of Wisconsin–Madison and his non-profit organization Project 1808, Inc.

Controversial experiment
Kawaoka reinvented a new virus based on H5N1, which he revealed to the public in 2011. For now, no known vaccine has been found. His research was halted by a moratorium issued from the US government in 2014. However, in 2019 he was allowed to resume the research.

Dan Brown mentioned the experiment in his novel Inferno.

Recognition 
2006 – Robert Koch Prize (with Peter Palese)
2011 – Medal with Purple Ribbon
2013 – Members of the United States National Academy of Sciences
2014 – Popular Mechanics Breakthrough Award
2015 – Carlos J. Finlay Prize for Microbiology
2016 – Japan Academy Prize
2018 – Sir Michael Stoker Prize

Selected publications

References

External links

Robert Koch Award lecture: New possibilities in the fight against influenza (3 November 2006)

Living people
1955 births
People from Kobe
Influenza researchers
American virologists
Japanese virologists
Japanese microbiologists
University of Wisconsin–Madison faculty
Academic staff of the University of Tokyo
Hokkaido University alumni
Recipients of the Medal of Honor (Japan)
Foreign associates of the National Academy of Sciences